Jesús Jorge Ejército (July 10, 1939 – August 8, 1988), better known as George Estregan or George Estregan Sr., was a Filipino mestizo film actor.

Estregan made his film debut in 1963 with Jose Nazareno, ang Taxi Driver. He was often cast as a villain and was infamously known as the "Penetration King" of erotic Philippine cinema.

Estregan won critical acclaim for many of his performances. In 1972, he was named FAMAS Best Actor for Sukdulan, and would win two other FAMAS Awards for Best Supporting actor for Kid Kaliwete (1978) and Lumakad Kang Hubad sa Mundong Ibabaw (1980). He was nominated for the FAMAS Award three other times, as Best Actor for Lumapit, Lumayo ang Umaga (1975) and Lalake Ako (1982), and for Best Supporting Actor in Magkayakap sa Magdamag (1986). He also received a nomination from the Gawad Urian as Best Actor for Hostage: Hanapin si Batuigas (1977).

Early life
Jesus Jorge Marcelo Ejercito was born on July 10, 1939, at Manuguit Maternity Hospital (now known as Amisola Maternity Hospital) in Tondo, Manila, to Engr. Emilio Ejercito Sr. and Mary Ejercito. His older brother is former Philippine President and former Manila Mayor, Joseph Estrada.

Personal life
He was married to Ramona Pelayo-Ejercito of Ibajay, Aklan, with whom he had four children: actor Emilio Ramon Ejercito III ("George Estregan, Jr."), Maria Georgina Ejercito, Kurt Joseph Ejercito, and George Gerald Ejercito. He was also the father of actor Gary Jason Ejercito ("Gary Estrada") and Philippine Basketball Association player Rain or Shine Elasto Painters Gherome Eric Ejercito out of wedlock. His grandson Kiko Estrada is also an actor.

Death
Estregan died when he was 49 years old on August 8, 1988, at Our Lady of Lourdes Hospital in Santa Mesa, Manila after an eight-month battle with bone cancer. There were rumors that he had succumbed to AIDS.

Filmography

Film

Camera and electrical department

References

Sources

George
George
1939 births
1988 deaths
20th-century Filipino male actors
Deaths from bone cancer
Deaths from cancer in the Philippines
Filipino male film actors
Male actors from Manila
People from San Juan, Metro Manila
People from Tondo, Manila
Tagalog people